Oph-IRS 48 is a star surrounded by an extraordinary protoplanetary disk, about 444 light-years from Earth in the constellation  of Ophiuchus.
The disk has revolutionized the view of planet formation in astronomy. 
Studies have shown that the millimeter dust particles are gathered in a crescent shape, while the gas (traced by CO molecules) and small dust grains follow a full disk ring structure . The centimeter grains are even more concentrated inside the crescent. This structure is consistent with theoretical predictions of dust trapping. Also the chemical composition has been studied, with molecules like H2CO being present. 
The dust trap is thought to be conducting the process of planet formation in this young system.

References

 
A-type main-sequence stars
Vortices